Accra rubicunda is a species of moth of the family Tortricidae first described by Józef Razowski in 1966. It is found in the Democratic Republic of the Congo.

References

External links

Moths described in 1966
Tortricini
Moths of Africa
Endemic fauna of the Democratic Republic of the Congo